Haiti competed at the 2012 Summer Paralympics in London, United Kingdom from August 29 to September 9, 2012.

Technically, it was Haiti's second participation in the Paralaympics. In 2008, however, the country's sole representative, powerlifter Nephtalie Jean Louis, was a non-starter in her event due to unspecified "problems with her weight". For the London Games, Haiti was represented by three athletes: wheelchair athlete Nephtalie Jean-Louis, this time in the women's javelin and the shot put; Josué Cajuste (who has "one leg much shorter than the other"), in the men's shot put and javelin; and Gaysli Leon, who "was paralysed in the 2010 earthquake", in road cycling in a handbike.

Athletics 

Men’s Field Events

Women’s Field Events

Cycling

Road

Men

See also

 Haiti at the 2012 Summer Olympics

References

Nations at the 2012 Summer Paralympics
2012
2012 in Haitian sport